Yu Fei (born 25 January 1984) is a Chinese rower. She competed in the women's eight event at the 2004 Summer Olympics.

References

1984 births
Living people
Chinese female rowers
Olympic rowers of China
Rowers at the 2004 Summer Olympics
Rowers from Beijing